The Common Burying Ground at Sandy Bank (officially known as Bell Rock Cemetery) is a historic cemetery in Malden, Massachusetts, US. It occupies a roughly rectangular parcel of land  in size, bounded by Medford Street on the north, Green Street on the east, Converse Avenue on the south and the Saugus Branch Railroad (now the Northern Strand Community Trail) on the west. It is the oldest cemetery in the city, established in 1649. Its earliest probable burial dates to that same year, although the oldest gravestone, that of Alice Brackenbury, bears the date 1670. The Malden Public Library, in its local history collection, has a multi-volume set of binders that contain alphabetically ordered photographs of every grave in the cemetery with the epitaphs on each gravestone transcribed below its picture.

The cemetery was listed on the National Register of Historic Places in 1981.

It is the final resting place of Michael Wigglesworth (1631–1705), a Puritan minister, doctor and poet whose poem, "The Day of Doom", was very popular in early New England and remained so for over a century.

See also
 National Register of Historic Places listings in Middlesex County, Massachusetts

References

External links
 City of Malden – Cemetery
 

1649 establishments in Massachusetts
Cemeteries on the National Register of Historic Places in Massachusetts
Cemeteries in Middlesex County, Massachusetts
Buildings and structures in Malden, Massachusetts
National Register of Historic Places in Middlesex County, Massachusetts